The International Federation of Resistance Fighters – Association of Anti-Fascists also known by its French initials FIR (Fédération Internationale des Résistantes - Association des Antifascistes) is an organization of veterans of the anti-Axis resistance fighters, partisans, members of the anti-Hitler coalition. During the Cold War, the work of the FIR was closely connected with issues of peace, disarmament, understanding and cooperation of countries of different political systems. The FIR gave the former resistance fighters a voice against the policy of military confrontation and the real threat of war. Member organizations in West and East took numerous initiatives to end the policy of confrontation.

History 
The FIR was founded in June 1951 in Vienna. It was formed by an earlier organization called the International Federation of Former Political Prisoners; the latter organization had been founded in Paris in 1947. (Other sources say 1946.)

In the following decades, FIR organized conferences on medical, political and historical themes. The aim was also to prove that the destruction of German fascism was not only the work of Army organizations, but that the role of partisans and resistance fighters were kept in good memory. To preserve the memory of the post-war generations, FIR set-up a historical commission, which published a total of ten “International issues of the resistance movement”, studies of the antifascist resistance fight in various European countries, including impressive reports on the uprising in Paris, Prague and Northern Italy as well as documents on the resistance in the concentration and extermination camps and the international participation in the national liberation struggle in various European countries, with a specific attention to the Jewish resistance movement. The aim of this memory was the historical education of young generations.

The medical and social conferences of the FIR highlighted the health consequences of persecution in Nazi prisons and the medical consequences for family members and the enforcement of appropriate compensation. There were repeated argumentation with social supply points about how long-term health damage by the prison time can be evaluated. Reputable physicians sat for the interests of a former persecuted and helped those that appropriate care and financial compensation was given.

A key task was the fight against the resurgence of neo-fascist organizations and political restoration, particularly in the Federal Republic of Germany. FIR repeatedly documented the reality of fascist crimes, to show what were the inhuman results of such a policy. But FIR did not only intelligence work. As Nazi graffiti became increasingly impertinent in Germany and further to the desecration of the Cologne synagogue in December 1959, FIR suggested to convene an “International Conference against the resurgence of Nazism and anti-Semitism”. Together with the International League for Human Rights, the Union of Israeli Jewish communities in Italy, the ANPPIA and ANED, FIR organized this conference in March 1960 in Florence, which was attended by 130 delegates from 13 countries.

A further step in the battle against the forces of the past, can be found in the campaign against the Association HIAG (“Aid Society of former member of the Waffen-SS”), initiated by the FIR the “International meeting against the re-emergence of Nazism and Fascism” in October 1963 in Florence. Under pressure from the FIR, HIAG call off their planned “European Convention”.

During the seventies, FIR supported the creation of a system of common security and cooperation in Europe. Along with other veterans’ organizations, particularly the World Veterans Federation (FMAC), FIR organized a “world meeting of former combatants for Disarmament” in 1979 in Rome.

FIR today 

In 2004, at the XIII regular congress in Berlin, FIR adopted a new statute that allowed the integration of young anti-fascists; since that time, the organization is named “International Federation of Resistance Fighters – Association of Anti-fascists” (FIR).

Today, the FIR incorporate member organizations in more than 25 European countries and Israel. The political circumstances have changed, but the main problem is fixed in the slogan “never again”. This means to disclose the historical truth about the resistance struggle, the reality of fascism and the role of the anti-Hitler coalition, the allied forces – including the Soviet soldiers who bore the brunt of the war – the destruction of the fascist barbarism.

Due to various activities and initiatives for disarmament and international cooperation, the Secretary General of the United Nations, on 15 September 1987, designated FIR as “Peace Messenger”. FIR is also the only antifascist organization officially accredited at the EU Transparency Register.

At the Prague-conference in 2016 the FIR awarded the Dutch anti-fascist Max van den Berg with their Michiel van der Borcht-prize for his life-long achievements.

The FIR supported the AFVN-protests against honoring Nazi-dead on the largest Nazi-cemetery in Europe, in the Ysselsteyn Nazi cemetery (over 31,000 Nazi and fascist dead). The FIR also supports their ongoing protests and actions against the free trade in Nazi paraphernalia.

Organization

Structure 
The federation is currently structured with national associations gathered in an Advisory Council – and an Executive Committee made of 10 members.

The 27th Regular congress, hold in Prague on 18/19 November 2016, confirmed Vilmos Hanti in his role of President of the federation and elected Filippo Giuffrida Repaci, General Michail A. Moiseev and Christos Tzintsilonis as Vicepresidents. Dr Ulrich Scheider was confirmed as Secretary General and Heinz Siefritz as Finance Secretary. The other members of the Executive Committee are Jean Cardoen, Alessandro Pollio Salimbeni, Nikolai Royanov and Gregori Touglidis.

General Assemblies  

Vienna, June 1951
Vienna, November 1954
Vienna, November 1958 (first session); March 1959 (second session)
Warsaw, December 1962
Budapest, December 1965
Athens, October 19 – 20, 2007
Berlin, January 9 – 10, 2010
Sofia, Bulgaria October 4 – 6, 2013
Prague, Czech Republic November 18 – 20, 2016
Reggio Emilia, Italy November 29–30, 2019

Members 

With the introduction of a new regulation, approved during the 13th congress, in 2004 FIR allowed a generational change of the directive members of the association, that, in 2015 counted about 1,000,000 affiliated, through the members of the national associations.

 - Veteranët e Luftës Antifashiste Nacionalçlirimtare Shqiptare
 - Vereinigung österreichischer Freiwilliger in der spanischen Republik
 - Bundesverband österreichischer Widerstandskämpfer und Antifaschisten
 - Veterans Organisation of the Republic of Belarus
 - Comité d’Action de la Résistance – Aktie Raad van de Weerstand
 - Udruženje veterana Narodnooslobodilačkog i antifašističkog rata Bosne i Hercegovine (1941-1945)
 - БЪЛГАРСКИ АНТИФАШИСТКИ СЪЮЗ / Union Antifasciste Bulgarie
 - Savez Antifasistisckih Boraca i Antifasista Republike Hrvatske
 - Cyprus Veterans Association World War II / Σύνδεσμος Βετεράνων Κύπρου Παγκόσμιος Πόλεμος
 - Pancyprian Democratic Resistance Association / Παγκύπρια Ένωση Δημοκρατικής Αντίστασης
 - Svaz bojovníků za svobodu/Verband der Freiheitskämpfer
 - FIR Danmark/FIR Denmark
 - Association Nationale des Cheminots Anciens Combattants
 - Union des Juifs pour la Résistance et l’Ent’aide
 - Association Nationale des Anciens Combattants de la Résistance
 - Comitee Internationale de Ravensbrück
 - Amicale des Anciens Guerrilleros Espanols en France
 - Comite Internationale Sachsenhausen
 - Verband Deutscher in der Resistance, in den Streikräften der Antihilterkoalition
 - Internationales Sachsenhausen Komitee
 - Lagergemeinschaft Ravensbrück/ Freundeskreise
 - Förderverein Gedenkstätte Steinwache / Internationales Rombergpark Komitee
 - Kämpfer und Freunde der Spanischen Republik 1936-1939
 - Vereinigung der Verfolgten des Naziregimes – Bund der Antifaschisten
 - Arbeitsgemeinschaft Neuengamme
 - Jenischer Bund in Deutschland
 - Panellínia Énosi Agonistón tis Ethnikís Antístasis / Union Panhellénique des Combattants de la Résistance Nationale
 - Panellínia énosi machitón tis Mésis Anatolís / Panhelleic ligue of Middle East-Fighters
 - Orgánosi gia tin katapolémisi tis máchis tis ethnikís prostasías / Organisation Panhellénique des Combattants de la Résistance Nationale
 - Panellínia Énosi Syndikalistón tis Ethnikís Antístasis / Ligue Panhellénique des Combattants de la Résistance Nationale
 - Panellínia Politistikí Etaireía Apogónous kai Fíloi tou Ethnikoú Anthektikoú kai Dimokratikoú Stratoú / Panhellenic Cultural Society Descendants and Friends of National Resistant and Democratic Army
 - Panellínia Omospondía Antistasiakón Organóseon / Panhellenic Federation of Resistance Organisations
 - Magyar Ellenállók és Antifasiszták Szövetségének / Verband der ungarischen Widerstandskämpfer und Antifaschisten- Gemeinsam für Demokratie
 - Association of Disabled Veterans of Fight against nazism
 - Organization of Partisans Underground Fighters and Ghetto Rebels in Israel
 - Veterans Union of World War II – Fighters Against Nazism
 - Associazione Nazionale Partigiani d’Italia
 - Associazione Partigiani Matteotti del Piemonte
 - Latvijas Tirailieru un partizānu 130. korpusa veterānu asociācija / Assoc. des Anciens Combattants du 130e Corps d’Armée de Tirailleurs Lettons et des Partisans
 - Les Amis des Brigades Internationales Luxembourg
 - Comite International de Sachsenhausen
 - Sojuz na veterani od nacionalnata osloboditelna i antifašistička vojna na Makedonija 1941 - 1945 godina / Union of Veterans from the national liberation and antifascist war of Macedonia 1941 – 1945
 - Vereniging Landlijk Kontakt-Groep Verzetsgepensioneerden (40-45)
 - Antifascistische oud-Verzetsstrijders Nederland / Bond van Antifascisten
 - Polski Zwiazek Bylych Wiezniów Politycznych Hitlerowskich Wiezién I Obozów Koncentracyjnych
 - União de Resistentes Antifascistas Portugueses
 - Asociatia Antifascistilor din Romania
 - Rossiyskiy obshchestvennyy komitet byvshikh voinov / Russisches gesellschaftliches Komitee der ehemaligen Kriegsteilnehmer
 - International Association of Veterans Organizations
 - Saveza udruženja boraca narodnooslobodilackog rata Srbije 1941-1945
 - Slovensky Svaz Protifasistict Bojovnikot Ustiedny Vybor
 - Zvezo združenj borcev za vrednote NOB
 - Amicale de Mauthausen y otros campos
 - Associación Brigadas Internationales (Voluntarios de la Libertad)
 - Associación de Ex-Presos y Represaliados Politicos Antifranquistas
 - Associacio Catalana d’Expresos Politics
 - All-Ukrainian Union of War Veterans

FIR Bulletin 
FIR monthly publishes a magazine named “FIR Bulletin” in three languages. The magazine focuses on historical-political issues; it contributes to notify events related to the European and International resistance.

See also 
World Veterans Federation
World Federation of Trade Unions
Women's International Democratic Federation
World Federation of Democratic Youth
International Union of Students
International Organization of Journalists
International Association of Democratic Lawyers
World Federation of Scientific Workers
World Peace Council
Veterans of the Abraham Lincoln Brigade

References

External links 
 

Internationale Föderation der Widerstandskampfer (International Federation of Resistance Fighters), report, 1961

Communist front organizations
Organizations established in 1951
Veterans' organizations
Anti-fascist organizations